Wind music has two different meanings:
Music written for wind instruments
Music produced using the wind (rather than, say, breath). These are chiefly string instruments, such as the Aeolian harp, but some woodwinds are also known.

Wind Music can refer to:
Wind Music (record label), a Taiwanese music company

Musical techniques